The 2018–19 Handball-Bundesliga was the 54th season of the Handball-Bundesliga, Germany's premier handball league and the 42nd season consisting of only one league. It ran from 23 August 2018 to 9 June 2019.

SG Flensburg-Handewitt won their third overall and second consecutive title.

Teams

Team changes

Arenas and locations
The SAP Arena in Mannheim, home of the Rhein-Neckar Löwen, is the largest venue in the league as it seats 13,200 fans in its HBL configuration. While the smallest is the Scharrena, the smaller of the two home venues of TVB Stuttgart, only being able to accommodate 2,251 fans.

Personnel and finances

Standings

Results

Awards

Monthly awards

The goal of the month award can be awarded to anyone in the league system while the player of the month award only count Bundesliga performances.

Number of teams by state

References

External links
Official website 

Handball-Bundesliga
2018–19 domestic handball leagues
2018 in German sport
2019 in German sport